Raghiveh (also Romanized as Raghīveh; also known as Rasīveh) is a village in Chenaneh Rural District, Fath Olmobin District, Shush County, Khuzestan Province, Iran. At the 2006 census, its population was 215, in 29 families.

References 

Populated places in Shush County